George Walker (born 24 May 1909) was a Scottish footballer who played as a centre half for St Mirren, Notts County, Crystal Palace, Watford and Scotland. He made 102 Football League appearances for Crystal Palace, scoring once, between June 1936 and July 1939.

He was the nephew of Heart of Midlothian and Scotland forward Bobby Walker; his sisters were both married to footballers on the same day in 1935 (Jenny to Bobby Hogg of Celtic and Mary to Tom Fenner latterly of Bradford City).

References
Footnotes

Sources

External links

George Walker at holmesdale.net

1909 births
Year of death missing
Scottish footballers
Scotland international footballers
Association football central defenders
St Mirren F.C. players
Notts County F.C. players
Crystal Palace F.C. players
Watford F.C. players
Scottish Football League players
Scottish Junior Football Association players
English Football League players
Scottish Football League representative players
Sportspeople from Musselburgh
Rosslyn Juniors F.C. players
Footballers from East Lothian